Type XXI submarines were a class of German diesel–electric Elektroboot (German: "electric boat") submarines designed during the Second World War. One hundred and eighteen were completed, with four being combat-ready. During the war only two were put into active service and went on patrols, but these were not used in combat.

They were the first submarines designed to operate primarily submerged, rather than spending most of their time as surface ships that could submerge for brief periods as a means of escaping detection. They incorporated many batteries to increase the time they could spend submerged, to as much as several days, and they only needed to surface to periscope depth for recharging via a snorkel. The design included many general improvements as well: much greater underwater speed by an improved hull design, greatly improved diving times, power-assisted torpedo reloading and greatly improved crew accommodations. However, the design was also flawed in many ways, with the submarines being mechanically unreliable and vulnerable to combat damage. The Type XXI submarines were also rushed into production before design work was complete, and the inexperienced facilities which constructed the boats were unable to meet necessary quality standards.

After the war, several navies obtained Type XXIs and operated them for decades in various roles, while large navies introduced new submarine designs based on them. These include the Soviet , American , British Porpoise, and Swedish  classes, all based on the Type XXI design to some extent.

Description
The main features of the Type XXI were the hydrodynamically streamlined hull and conning tower and the large number of battery cells, roughly triple that of the German Type VII submarine. This gave these boats great underwater range and dramatically reduced the time spent on or near the surface. Being designed primarily for submerged use, the Type XXI's maximum surface speed (15.6 knots) was slightly lower than that of the Type IX (18.2 knots) but its submerged speed was twice that of the Type IX's (17.2 knots versus 7.7 knots) because they were equipped with much more powerful electric drive motors and had a more hydrodynamically streamlined hull.

The Type XXI was also much quieter than the VIIC, making it more difficult to detect when submerged and the design eliminated protruding components that created drag with earlier models. The ability to outrun many surface ships while submerged, combined with improved dive times (also a product of the new hull form), made the Type XXI much more difficult to pursue and destroy. It also provided a 'sprint ability' when positioning itself for an attack. Older boats had to surface to sprint into position. This often revealed a boat's location, especially after aircraft became available for convoy escort. The Type XXI was also equipped with an additional pair of electric creep motors for occasions when silent running was necessary.

The Type XXI was equipped with six bow torpedo tubes (instead of the more common four in German submarines) and carried 23 torpedoes. 
It featured an electric torpedo-reloading system that allowed all six bow torpedo tubes to be reloaded faster than a Type VIIC could reload one tube. The Type XXI could fire 18 torpedoes in less than 20 minutes. The class also featured a very sensitive passive sonar for the time, housed in the "chin" of the hull.

The Type XXIs also had better facilities than previous U-boat classes, with much roomier crew berths, and a freezer to prevent food spoilage. The increased capacity allowed for a crew of 57.

A post-war assessment of the Type XXI by the United States Navy concluded that while the design had some admirable features, it was seriously flawed. The submarines' engines were underpowered, which limited the surface speed and increased the time required to charge the batteries. The hydraulic system was unduly complex, and its main elements were located outside the pressure hull. This made the system highly vulnerable to corrosion and damage. The snorkel was also badly designed, and difficult to use in practice.

Construction

This was the first U-boat to be constructed of modular components to allow for the manufacture of the various components in different factories and subsequent assembly at the shipyard.

Between 1943 and 1945, 118 boats were assembled by Blohm & Voss of Hamburg, AG Weser of Bremen and Schichau-Werke of Danzig. Each hull was constructed from nine prefabricated sections with final assembly at the shipyards. This new method allowed for a hypothetical construction time of less than six months per vessel, but in practice all the assembled U-boats were plagued with severe quality problems that required extensive post-production work and time to rectify. One of the reasons for these shortcomings was that sections were made by companies having little experience with shipbuilding, after a decision by Albert Speer. As a result, of 118 Type XXIs constructed, only four were fit for combat before the Second World War ended in Europe. Of these, only two conducted combat patrols and neither sank any Allied ships. Post-war assessments by the US Navy and British Royal Navy also found that the completed submarines had poor structural integrity due to the manufacturing problems. This rendered the submarines highly vulnerable to depth charges, and gave them a lesser maximum diving depth than earlier U-boat designs.

It was planned that final assembly of Type XXI boats would eventually be carried out in the Valentin submarine pens, a massive, bomb–hardened concrete bunker built at the small port of Farge, near Bremen. The pens were constructed between 1943 and 1945, using about 10,000 concentration camp prisoners and prisoners of war as forced labour. The facility was 90% completed when, during March 1945, it was heavily damaged by Allied bombing with Grand Slam "earthquake" bombs and abandoned. A few weeks later the area was captured by the British Army.

Due to the combination of design and construction problems, historian Clay Blair judged that "the XXI could not have made a big difference in the Battle of the Atlantic.

Sensors

Radar detector
The FuMB Ant 3 Bali radar detector and antenna was located on top of the snorkel head.

Radar transmitter
The Type XXI boats were fitted with the FuMO 65 Hohentwiel U1 with the Type F432 D2 radar transmitter.

Wartime and post-war service

Germany

The commander of U-2511 claimed the U-boat had a British cruiser in her sights on 4 May when news of the German cease-fire was received. He further claimed she made a practice attack before leaving the scene undetected.

During 1957, which had been scuttled at the end of the war, was raised and refitted as research vessel Wilhelm Bauer of the Bundesmarine. It was operated by both military and civilian crews for research purposes until 1982. During 1984, it was made available for display to the public by the Deutsches Schiffahrtsmuseum (German Maritime Museum) in Bremerhaven, Germany.

France
 became . It was used for active service during the Suez Crisis in 1956, and remained in commission until 1967. It was scrapped in 1969.

Soviet Union
However, Western intelligence believed the Soviets had acquired several more Type XXI boats; a review by the U.S. Joint Intelligence Committee for the Joint Chiefs of Staff during January 1948 estimated the Soviet Navy then had 15 Type XXIs operational, could complete construction of 6 more within 2 months, and could build another 39 within a year and a half from prefabricated sections, since several factories producing Type XXI components and the assembly yard at Danzig had been captured by the Soviets at the end of World War II. U-3538 — U-3557 (respectively TS-5 – TS-19 and TS-32 – TS-38) remained incomplete at Danzig and were scrapped or sunk during 1947. The four boats assigned by Potsdam were used in trials and tests until 1955, then scuttled or used for weapon testing between 1958 and 1973. The Type XXI design formed the basis for several Soviet design projects, Projects 611, 613, 614, 633, and 644.

United Kingdom

It was used for tests until being scrapped during November 1949.

United States

U-2513 was sunk as a target on 7 October 1951; U-3008 was sold for scrap on 15 September 1955.

Survivor

Records indicate that this sub was scuttled by its crew in 1945, salvaged in 1957 and refurbished for use by the West German Bundesmarine until retirement in 1982. It was then modified to appear in wartime configuration for exhibition purposes.

Notable wrecks
The wrecks of several Type XXI boats are known to exist. The bunker has since been filled in with gravel, although even that did not initially deter many souvenir hunters who measured the position of open hatches and dug down to them to allow the removal of artifacts. The wrecks now lie beneath a car park (parking lot), making them inaccessible.

The boat has been visited by divers, but the depth makes this very difficult and the site is considered suitable for only advanced divers. Four other boats lie off the coast of Northern Ireland, where they were sunk during 1946 as part of Operation Deadlight. Both were found to be in remarkably good condition.

Influences
The Chinese-built Romeo-class submarines, and the subsequent , were based on Soviet blueprints.

See also
 List of Type XXI submarines
 British R-class submarine

Notes

References

 
 Fitzsimons, Bernard, general editor. The Encyclopedia of 20th Century Weapons and Warfare (London: Phoebus Publishing Company, 1978), Volume 24, p. 2594, "'Whiskey'", and p. 2620, "'Zulu'".

External links

 U-Boot Type XXI in Detail  with photos.
 
 Type XXI on www.uboataces.com

 
Submarine classes
World War II submarines of Germany